The 2019 Belmont Stakes was the 151st running of the Belmont Stakes and the 108th time the event took place at Belmont Park. The  race, known as the "test of the champion", is the final leg in the American Triple Crown, open to three-year-old Thoroughbreds. Sir Winston won the race, with a time of 2:28.30.

The race took place on June 8, 2019, in Elmont, New York, with post time scheduled for 6:37 p.m. ET. It was a Grade I stakes race with a purse of $1.5 million, broadcast on NBC with coverage of the undercard on NBCSN. There was no chance of a Triple Crown winner, as Kentucky Derby winner Country House did not run in the Preakness Stakes, due to his trainer detecting a virus.

Field
Following the Preakness, likely contenders for the Belmont were:
 War of Will – winner of the Preakness, seventh in the Kentucky Derby
 Tacitus – third in the Kentucky Derby, winner of the Tampa Bay Derby and Wood Memorial Stakes
 Everfast – second in the Preakness
 Bourbon War – eighth in the Preakness
 Sir Winston – second in the Peter Pan Stakes
 Intrepid Heart – third in the Peter Pan
 Master Fencer – sixth in the Kentucky Derby
 Tax – 14th in the Kentucky Derby, second in the Wood Memorial
 Spinoff – 18th in the Kentucky Derby
 Joevia – winner of the Long Branch Stakes

Results
The post position draw was held on June 4 at Citi Field, prior to that day's New York Mets game.

 Starts–Wins–Places–Shows, prior to the Belmont

Track: Fast

Times:  mile – 23.92;  mile – 48.79;  mile – 1:13.54; mile – 1:38.27;  miles – 2:02.72; final – 2:28.30.
Splits for each quarter-mile: (23.92) (24.87) (24.75) (24.73) (24.45) (25.58)

Source: Equibase Chart

Payouts

 $1 Exacta: (7-10) $48.00
 $1 Trifecta: (7-10-1) $1,244.00
 $1 Superfecta: (7-10-1-4) $10,428.00

Source:

Wagering 
Wagering on the Belmont Stakes day totaled US$102.2 million, including US$53.2 million on the Belmont Stakes race, and the three-day Belmont Stakes Racing Festival had a total wagering handle of US$131.9 million. NYRA said it was the highest for an edition with no Triple Crown candidate; the 2018 Belmont Stakes day had a wagering handle of US$138.0 million.

References

External links
BelmontStakes.com

Belmont Stakes races
Belmont Stakes
Belmont Stakes
Belmont Stakes
Belmont Stakes